In mathematics, a totally positive matrix is a square matrix in which all the minors are positive: that is, the determinant of every square submatrix is a positive number.  A totally positive matrix has all entries positive, so it is also a positive matrix; and it has all principal minors positive (and positive eigenvalues). A symmetric totally positive matrix is therefore also positive-definite. A totally non-negative matrix is defined similarly, except that all the minors must be non-negative (positive or zero). Some authors use "totally positive" to include all totally non-negative matrices.

Definition

Let 
be an n × n matrix. Consider any  and any p × p submatrix of the form 
where:

Then A is a totally positive matrix if:

for all submatrices  that can be formed this way.

History

Topics which historically led to the development of the theory of total positivity include the study of:

 the spectral properties of kernels and matrices which are totally positive,
 ordinary differential equations whose Green's function is totally positive (by M. G. Krein and some colleagues in the mid-1930s),
 the variation diminishing properties (started by I. J. Schoenberg in 1930),
 Pólya frequency functions (by I. J. Schoenberg in the late 1940s and early 1950s).

Examples

For example, a Vandermonde matrix whose nodes are positive and increasing is a totally positive matrix.

See also

 Compound matrix

References

Further reading

External links
 Spectral Properties of Totally Positive Kernels and Matrices, Allan Pinkus
 Parametrizations of Canonical Bases and Totally Positive Matrices, Arkady Berenstein
 Tensor Product Multiplicities, Canonical Bases And Totally Positive Varieties (2001), A. Berenstein , A. Zelevinsky

Matrix theory
Determinants